Stylosanthes fruticosa (syn. Arachis fruticosa), the African stylo, wild lucerne or shrubby pencilflower, is a species of flowering plant in the family Fabaceae. It is native to Cape Verde, sub-Saharan Africa, Madagascar, the Arabian Peninsula, India, Sri Lanka and Myanmar, and has been introduced to Hawaii. Relished by livestock, it can survive light shade, acid soils and even light frosts.

References

fruticosa
Forages
Flora of Cape Verde
Flora of West Tropical Africa
Flora of West-Central Tropical Africa
Flora of Northeast Tropical Africa
Flora of East Tropical Africa
Flora of South Tropical Africa
Flora of Southern Africa
Flora of Madagascar
Flora of the Arabian Peninsula
Flora of India (region)
Flora of Sri Lanka
Flora of Myanmar
Plants described in 1931